A worst-case scenario is a risk management planning tool. 

Worst-case scenario may also refer to:

Music
 Worst Case Scenario Records, a UK record label
 Worst Case Scenario (album), by dEUS
 "Worst Case Scenario" (song), by The Hoosiers

Television
 Worst Case Scenario (Star Trek: Voyager), an episode
 Worst Case Scenarios, a reality show aired on TBS in 2002 in the U.S.
 Worst-Case Scenario (TV series), a survival show hosted by Bear Grylls aired on Discovery Channel in 2010

Other uses
 Worst-Case Scenario series, of books, games, calendars, and two television series inspired by The Worst-Case Scenario Survival Handbook
 Worst Case Scenario (film), a Dutch horror film

See also

 Best, worst and average case, in computer science
 Worst Case (novel), a 2010 novel by James Patterson
 Scenario planning, a strategic planning method
 Murphy's law
 Case (disambiguation)
 Scenario (disambiguation)
 The Worst (disambiguation)